Hakimabad (also Romanized as Ḩakīmābād) is a village in Katul Rural District, in the Central District of Aliabad County, Golestan Province, Iran. At the 2006 census, its population was 2,018, in 470 families.

References 

Populated places in Aliabad County